Emmanuella Lambropoulos (born September 12, 1990) is a Canadian politician serving as the Member of Parliament (MP) for Saint-Laurent since 2017. A member of the Liberal Party of Canada, she was elected to the House of Commons in a by-election, succeeding Stéphane Dion.

A 26-year-old teacher from Rosemount High School at the time of her election, she won the Liberal nomination in an upset, defeating former provincial immigration minister Yolande James and future Liberal MNA Marwah Rizqy.

Early life 

Lambropoulos was born on September 12, 1990 and was raised in the Saint-Laurent borough of Montréal. She attended Gardenview elementary school, LaurenHill Academy high school and Vanier College, where she received the Program Award upon graduation, awarded in recognition of outstanding achievement in the Social Science (Psychology Major) Program. During her time at Vanier, Emmanuella was a member of the Vanier Key Society, a group composed of a talented group of students chosen for their high academic standing, strong communication skills and demonstrated leadership abilities. She then graduated from McGill University with a Bachelor of Education in 2013, where she was the president of the McGill Hellenic Students Association. She then became a teacher at Rosemount High School, where she taught French and history. 
Most recently, Emmanuella Lambropoulos completed her Masters of Arts in Educational Leadership from McGill University.

Political career 

Born and raised in Saint-Laurent, Emmanuella Lambropoulos has been representing the riding in the House of Commons since she was elected in the 2017 by-election. The seat in Saint-Laurent became available after the incumbent MP, Stéphane Dion, announced he would be leaving politics in January 2017, following a cabinet shuffle in which he lost his portfolio as foreign affairs minister. Lambropoulos had previously volunteered on Dion's team.

Lambropoulos won the Liberal nomination on March 8, 2017 against the favoured candidate, Yolande James. James had previously been a provincial cabinet minister with strong ties to the Liberal party. However, she came in third place. Another likely candidate, Alan DeSousa, was not included on the ballot at all after being turned down by the Liberal Party. Lambropoulos's campaign received strong support from the Greek community.

She was officially elected as an MP in the Saint-Laurent by-election on April 3, 2017 with 59.1% of votes. Ms. Lambropoulos has served on the parliamentary committees for Veterans Affairs (May 2017-Sept 2018), Status of Women (Sept 2017-Sept 2019), and Official Languages (Sept 2018-Sept 2019). Her most frequently-discussed topics in Parliament are disabilities and the status of women. As part of her work for the Status of Women committee, she has studied such issues as shelters and transition homes for women who are seeking to escape domestic violence, and barriers to women entering politics. On the Official Languages committee, she advocates for anglophones as the minority language group in Québec.

On October 21, 2019, she was elected with 58.9% of the popular vote.

On September 20, 2021, she was elected with 59% of the votes.

Personal life 

Lambropoulos speaks English, French, and Greek.

Committees 

Veterans Affair from May 1, 2017 to September 19, 2018
Status of Women from September 18, 2017 to September 11, 2019
Official Languages from September 19, 2018 to November 19, 2020
Industry, Science and Technology from February 5, 2020 to Present 
Public Safety from November 30, 2020 to Present
COVID-19 Pandemic from April 20, 2020 to June 18, 2020

On November 30, 2020, Emmanuella Lambropoulos became a member of the standing committee on Public Safety and National Security.
During one of her first meetings at the Public Safety and National Security committee, she asked the chair of the Centre for Cyber Security how Canadian companies who deal directly with state-owned enterprises can protect themselves from cyber threats.

Lambropoulos is said to have helped many organizations in her riding, one of them is Centre communauté Bon courage , an organization that offers services to the riding's neediest families, obtain a total grant of $37,000 from the Canada Summer Jobs program. This organization succeeded in hiring 12 people, including five animation positions at Painter Park, following a joint job offer with Lambropoulos' Youth Council.

Electoral record

References

External links

Living people
1990 births
Anglophone Quebec people
Canadian people of Greek descent
Canadian schoolteachers
Women members of the House of Commons of Canada
Liberal Party of Canada MPs
McGill University Faculty of Education alumni
Members of the House of Commons of Canada from Quebec
21st-century Canadian politicians
21st-century Canadian women politicians
People from Saint-Laurent, Quebec
Politicians from Montreal